Helmut Hagg (born 24 May 1932) is a German cross-country skier. He competed at the 1956 Winter Olympics and the 1960 Winter Olympics.

References

External links
 

1932 births
Living people
German male cross-country skiers
Olympic cross-country skiers of the United Team of Germany
Cross-country skiers at the 1956 Winter Olympics
Cross-country skiers at the 1960 Winter Olympics
People from Immenstadt
Sportspeople from Swabia (Bavaria)